Will(iam) Hubbard may refer to:

William Hubbard (clergyman) (1621–1704), English minister and historical writer in colonial America
William Hubbard (New Brunswick politician) (1751–1813), lawyer, judge and politician in New Brunswick, Canada
William Blackstone Hubbard (1795–1866), American politician and Freemason
William C. Hubbard, American lawyer
William Peyton Hubbard (1842–1935), Canadian politician
William Pallister Hubbard (1843–1921), American legislator
William Henry Hubbard (1886–1960), Canadian aviator
Will Hubbard (1895–1969), English aviator
William Hubbard, British soldier commemorated in "The Ballad of Bill Hubbard" by Roger Waters

See also
Hubbard (surname)